Angola competed at the 1988 Summer Olympics in Seoul, South Korea. 24 competitors, 19 men and 5 women, took part in 27 events in 4 sports. The nation returned to the Olympic Games after boycotting the 1984 Summer Olympics.

Competitors
The following is the list of number of competitors in the Games.

Athletics

Men
Track & road events

Field events

Women
Track & road events

Boxing

Men

Judo

Men

Swimming

Men

Women

References

Nations at the 1988 Summer Olympics
1988
Olympics